The Electronic Challenge Vol. 3 is a various artists compilation album released on November 30, 1999 by COP International.

Reception

AllMusic gave The Electronic Challenge Vol. 3 a two-out-of-five possible stars. CMJ New Music Monthly commended The Electronic Challenge Vol. 3 for "present[ing] a slew of blood-boiling, hard-hitting tracks from industrial giants and rising renegades."

Track listing

Personnel
Adapted from the liner notes of The Electronic Challenge Vol. 3.

 Marcus Becker – compiling
 K. Dee – compiling
 Christian Petke (as Count Zero) – compiling
 Gunnar Schreck – compiling
 Guido Nockermann – photography

Release history

References

External links 
 The Electronic Challenge Vol. 3 at Discogs (list of releases)

1999 compilation albums
COP International compilation albums